A by-election was held for the New South Wales Legislative Assembly electorate of Clarence on 14 August 1915 following the death of John McFarlane. There were two candidates endorsed by the Farmers and Settlers Party.

Dates

Results

John McFarlane died.

See also
Electoral results for the district of Clarence
List of New South Wales state by-elections

Notes

References

1915 elections in Australia
New South Wales state by-elections
1910s in New South Wales